Germa or Germe  or Germae or Germai (Γέρμαι), or Hiera Germa or Hiera Germe (Ἱερά Γέρμη), meaning 'holy Germa', also known as Germa in Hellesponto to distinguish it from several other towns named Germa, was a town of ancient Mysia, situated between the rivers Macestus and Rhyndacus. It appears in episcopal notices as an archbishopric. and was represented at the Council of Ephesus and Calcedon by the towns bishop. No longer the seat of a residential archbishop, it remains a titular see of the Roman Catholic Church.

Its site is located near Karaçam in Savaştepe, Asiatic Turkey.

References

Populated places in ancient Mysia
Former populated places in Turkey
Catholic titular sees in Asia
History of Balıkesir Province
Roman towns and cities in Turkey